Lebeda nobilis, commonly known as the tea-oil caterpillar moth, is a moth of the family Lasiocampidae. It is found in Taiwan, China, India, Nepal and Indonesia.

The larvae feed on various plants, including Pteridium, Pinus, Rubus, and tea-oil camellia.

References 

Lasiocampinae
Moths of Japan
Moths described in 1855